The Ibicuí-Mirim River (Portuguese, Rio Ibicuí-Mirim) is a river of Rio Grande do Sul state in southern Brazil. It joins the Toropi River to form the Ibicuí River.

See also
List of rivers of Rio Grande do Sul

References

Rivers of Rio Grande do Sul